Pârâul Adânc may refer to:

 Valea Adânca, a tributary of the Olt in Brașov County
 Pârâul Adânc, a tributary of the Cracăul Alb in Neamț County
 Pârâul Adânc, a tributary of the Avrig in Sibiu County
 Pârâul Adânc, a tributary of the Olt in Covasna County